Émile Léopold François Vadbled (born 21 April 1876, date of death unknown) was a French cyclist. He competed in the men's sprint event at the 1900 Summer Olympics.

References

External links
 

1876 births
Year of death missing
French male cyclists
Olympic cyclists of France
Cyclists at the 1900 Summer Olympics
Sportspeople from Seine-Maritime
Place of death missing